This article contains information about the literary events and publications of 1998.

Events
March 5 – Tennessee Williams' 1938 play Not About Nightingales receives its stage première in London, in a collaboration between the Royal National Theatre of Great Britain and Corin and Vanessa Redgrave's Moving Theatre.
October
The death of the Poet Laureate of the United Kingdom Ted Hughes leaves a gap of several months before a successor, Andrew Motion, is designated the following spring. 
Kinoko Nasu (奈須きのこ) launches the Kara no Kyōkai series, with five chapters released online.
November 18 – Alice McDermott wins the National Book Award with her novel Charming Billy.
December – The Strand Magazine title is revived in the United States.

New books

Fiction
Turki al-Hamad – Adama (first volume in Atyaf al-Aziqah al-Mahjurah (Phantoms of the Deserted Alley) trilogy)
Tariq Ali – The Book of Saladin
Aaron Allston
Iron Fist
Wraith Squadron
Hanan al-Shaykh – I Sweep the Sun off Rooftops (أكنس الشمس عن السطوح)
Martin Amis – Heavy Water and Other Stories (most stories previously published)
Beryl Bainbridge – Master Georgie
Iain M. Banks – Inversions
Alessandro Barbero – Romanzo russo. Fiutando i futuri supplizi (translated 2010 as The Anonymous Novel. Sensing the Future Torments)
Julian Barnes – England, England
Greg Bear
Dinosaur Summer
Foundation and Chaos
Raymond Benson – The Facts of Death
Alfred Bester and Roger Zelazny – Psychoshop
Robert Bloch – Flowers from the Moon and Other Lunacies
Roberto Bolaño – The Savage Detectives (Los Detectives Salvajes)
Xurxo Borrazás – Contos malvados
William Boyd – Armadillo
Giannina Braschi – Yo-Yo Boing!
Anne Carson – Autobiography of Red (verse novel)
Driss Chraïbi – Muhammad
Mary Higgins Clark – All Through the Night
Tom Clancy – Rainbow Six
Paulo Coelho – Veronika Decides to Die
Michael Connelly – Blood Work
Bernard Cornwell – Sharpe's Triumph
Patricia Cornwell – Point of Origin
Douglas Coupland – Girlfriend in a Coma
Ann C. Crispin – Rebel Dawn
Michael Cunningham – The Hours
Nelson DeMille – Plum Island
August Derleth
The Final Adventures of Solar Pons
In Lovecraft's Shadow
Peter Dickinson – The Kin
Allan W. Eckert – Return to Hawk's Hill
Bret Easton Ellis – Glamorama
Giles Foden – The Last King of Scotland
Diana Gabaldon – Hellfire
Neil Gaiman – Smoke and Mirrors (mainly reprints)
Andrew Greeley – A Midwinter's Tale
John Grisham – The Street Lawyer
Wolf Haas – Komm, süßer Tod (Come, Sweet Death)
Margaret Peterson Haddix - Among the Hidden
Ha Jin (哈金) – Waiting
Tomson Highway – Kiss of the Fur Queen
Nick Hornby – About a Boy
Michel Houellebecq – Atomised (Les Particules élémentaires)
Marek S. Huberath – Gniazdo światów (Nest of Worlds)
John Irving – A Widow for One Year
K. W. Jeter
The Mandalorian Armor
Slave Ship
Wayne Johnston – The Colony of Unrequited Dreams
Stephen King – Bag of Bones
Barbara Kingsolver – The Poisonwood Bible
Dean R. Koontz – Seize the Night
Joe R. Lansdale
Rumble Tumble
The Boar
Alain Mabanckou – Bleu-Blanc-Rouge
Patrick McCabe – Breakfast on Pluto
Ian McEwan – Amsterdam
Roy MacLaren – African Exploits
Steve Martin – Pure Drivel
Carol Matas – Greater Than Angels
China Miéville – King Rat
Alice Munro – The Love of a Good Woman
Haruki Murakami (村上 春樹) – The Wind-Up Bird Chronicle (ねじまき鳥クロニクル, Nejimakidori Kuronikuru)
Cees Nooteboom – All Souls' Day (Allerzielen)
Sigrid Nunez – Mitz: The Marmoset of Bloomsbury
Tim O'Brien – Tomcat in Love
Orhan Pamuk – My Name Is Red (Benim Adım Kırmızı)
Tom Perrotta – Election
Terry Pratchett
Carpe Jugulum
The Last Continent
Fahmida Riaz – Godavari
David Adams Richards – The Bay of Love and Sorrows
José Luis Rodríguez Pittí – Crónica de invisibles
Philip Roth – I Married a Communist
Margit Sandemo – Ensam i världen (Alone in the World)
Michael Slade – Shrink (also Primal Scream)
Alexander McCall Smith – The No. 1 Ladies' Detective Agency
Michael Stackpole – I, Jedi
Danielle Steel
The Klone and I
The Long Road Home
Mirror Image
Thomas Sullivan – The Martyring
Andrew Vachss – Safe House
Connie Willis – To Say Nothing of the Dog
A. N. Wilson – Dream Children
Tom Wolfe – A Man in Full
Timothy Zahn – Vision of the Future

Children and young people
David Almond – Skellig
Melvin Burgess – Junk
Denise Fleming – Mama Cat Has Three Kittens
Gayle Greeno (with Michael Gilbert) – Sunderlies Seeking
Tanya Huff – Summon the Keeper
Diana Wynne Jones – Dark Lord of Derkholm
Dick King-Smith – The Crowstarver
Julius Lester – Black Cowboy, Wild Horses: A True Story
J. Patrick Lewis (with Gary Kelley) – BoshBlobberBosh: Runcible Poems for Edward Lear
J. K. Rowling – Harry Potter and the Chamber of Secrets
Louis Sachar – Holes
Robert Swindells – Abomination
Judy Waite – Mouse, Look Out!
Douglas Wood – Rabbit and the Moon

Drama
Edward Albee – The Play About the Baby
Parv Bancil – Made in England (full-length version)
Marina Carr – By the Bog of Cats
Michael Frayn – Copenhagen
David Hare – The Blue Room
Ted Hughes (translator) – Phèdre
Elfriede Jelinek – Ein Sportstück (A Sports Piece)
Sol B River
The White Witch of Rose Hall
River Plays 1 (published)
Shelagh Stephenson – An Experiment with an Air Pump
Marius von Mayenburg – Fireface (Feuergesicht)
Tennessee Williams (died 1983) – Not About Nightingales (first performance; written 1938)

Poetry

Seamus Heaney
Beowulf (translation)
Opened Ground: Poems 1966–1996
Ted Hughes – Birthday Letters
Dejan Stojanović – Krugovanje: 1978–1987 (Circling; 2nd edition)

Non-fiction
Charlotte Allen – The Human Christ: The Search For The Historical Jesus
Andrea Ashworth – Once in a House on Fire
Antony Beevor – Stalingrad
Bill Bryson – Notes from a Big Country
Peter Cannon (editor) – Lovecraft Remembered
Beth Chatto and Christopher Lloyd – Dear Friend and Gardener
Corinne Debaine-Francfort – La redécouverte de la Chine ancienne
Amanda Foreman – Georgiana, Duchess of Devonshire
John Fowles – Wormholes – Essays and Occasional Writings
Jonathan Freedland – Bring Home the Revolution
Sita Ram Goel – Vindicated by Time
Simon Heffer – Like the Roman: The Life of Enoch Powell
Adam Hochschild – King Leopold's Ghost: A Story of Greed, Terror and Heroism in Colonial Africa
A. P. J. Abdul Kalam – India 2020
Ryszard Kapuściński – Heban (Ebony, translated as The Shadow of the Sun)
B. B. Lal – India 1947–1997: New Light on the Indus Civilization
Eric Liu – The Accidental Asian
Alan I. Marcus – Building Western Civilization: From the Advent of Writing to the Age of Steam
Thylias Moss – Tale of a Sky-Blue Dress
Inga Muscio – Cunt: A Declaration of Independence
V. S. Naipaul – Beyond Belief: Islamic Excursions among the Converted Peoples
Gilles Perrault (ed.) – Le Livre noir du capitalisme (The Black Book of Capitalism)
John Pilger – Hidden Agendas
Michael Poole – Romancing Mary Jane
Arun Shourie – Eminent Historians: Their Technology, Their Line, Their Fraud
Marilee Strong – A Bright Red Scream
University of Arizona – Hopi Dictionary: Hopìikwa Lavàytutuveni
Adam Zagajewski – Another Beauty

Births
March 7 – Amanda Gorman, American poet and activist
May 15 – Mohammed El-Kurd, Palestinian writer and poet
December 16 – Chloe Gong, Chinese-born New Zealand author
unknown dates
K-Ming Chang – Taiwanese-American novelist and poet
Moses MacKenzie – British novelist

Deaths
January 2 – Frank Muir, English comedy writer and broadcaster (born 1920)
January 11 – John Wells, English satirist (born 1936)
January 18 – Monica Edwards, English children's novelist (born 1912)
January 23 – John Forbes, Australian poet (heart attack, born 1950)
January 27 – Geoffrey Trease, English children's historical novelist (born 1909)
February 7 – Lawrence Sanders, American novelist and short story writer (born 1920)
February 15 – Martha Gellhorn, American journalist (suicide, born 1908)
February 17 – Ernst Jünger, German novelist and war memoirist (born 1895)
March 15 – Dr. Benjamin Spock, American pediatrician and writer on child care (born 1903)
April 11 – Francis Durbridge, English playwright (born 1912)
April 19 – Octavio Paz, Mexican poet and Nobel Prize laureate (born 1914)
April 27
Anne Desclos (Pauline Réage), French journalist and novelist (born 1907)
Carlos Castaneda, Mexican-born American anthropologist and author (born 1925)
May 9 – Nat Perrin, American comedy writer (born 1905)
May 11 — Willy Corsari, Dutch author of detective fiction (born 1897)
June 10
Joan Adeney Easdale, English poet (born 1913)
Hammond Innes, English novelist (born 1913)
June 11 – Dame Catherine Cookson, English novelist (born 1906)
July 1 – Martin Seymour-Smith, English biographer (born 1928)
July 5 – Johnny Speight, English comedy writer (born 1920)
July 9 – Ian Wallace (John Wallace Pritchard), American science fiction author (born 1912)
July 14 – Miroslav Holub, Czech poet (born 1923)
July 23
John Hopkins, English film and television writer (born 1931)
Manuel Mejía Vallejo, Colombian novelist (born 1923)
August 16 – Dorothy West, American novelist and short story writer (born 1907)
August 22 – Grace Paley, American writer (born 1922)
September 28 – Eric Malling, Canadian journalist (born 1946)
October 15 – Iain Crichton Smith, Scottish writer (born 1928)
October 22 – Eric Ambler, English spy novelist (born 1909)
October 28 – Ted Hughes, English poet and Poet Laureate (born 1930)
November 3 – Bob Kane (Robert Kahn), American comics artist and writer (born 1915)
November 8 – Rumer Godden, English novelist (born 1907)
December 16 – William Gaddis, American novelist (born 1922)

Awards
Nobel Prize for Literature: José Saramago
Europe Theatre Prize: Luca Ronconi
Camões Prize: Antonio Candido

Australia
The Australian/Vogel Literary Award: Jennifer Kremmer, Pegasus in the Suburbs
C. J. Dennis Prize for Poetry: Coral Hull, Broken Land
Kenneth Slessor Prize for Poetry: No awards this year
Mary Gilmore Prize: Emma Lew, The Wild Reply
Miles Franklin Award: Peter Carey, Jack Maggs

Canada
Bronwen Wallace Memorial Award: Talya Rubin
See 1998 Governor General's Awards for a complete list of winners and finalists.
Giller Prize for Canadian Fiction: Alice Munro: The Love of a Good Woman
Edna Staebler Award for Creative Non-Fiction: Charlotte Gray: Mrs. King

France
Prix Décembre: Michel Houellebecq, Les Particules élémentaires
Prix Goncourt: Paule Constant, 
Prix Médicis French: 
Prix Médicis International:  – Jonathan Coe

United Kingdom
Booker Prize: Ian McEwan, Amsterdam
Carnegie Medal for children's literature: David Almond, Skellig
James Tait Black Memorial Prize for fiction: Beryl Bainbridge, Master Georgie
James Tait Black Memorial Prize for biography: Peter Ackroyd, The Life of Thomas More
Cholmondeley Award: Roger McGough, Robert Minhinnick, Anne Ridler, Ken Smith
Eric Gregory Award: Mark Goodwin, Joanne Limburg, Patrick McGuinness, Kona Macphee, Esther Morgan, Christiania Whitehead, Frances Williams
Orange Prize for Fiction: Carol Shields, Larry's Party
Queen's Gold Medal for Poetry: Les Murray
Whitbread Best Book Award: Ted Hughes, Birthday Letters

United States
Agnes Lynch Starrett Poetry Prize: Shara McCallum, The Water Between Us
Aiken Taylor Award for Modern American Poetry: X.J. Kennedy
American Academy of Arts and Letters Gold Medal for Drama: Horton Foote
American Book Award Before Columbus Foundation: Angela Davis, Blues Legacies and Black Feminism: Gertrude "Ma" Rainey, Bessie Smith, and Billie Holiday, and (separately) Allison Hedge Coke, Dog Road Woman
Bernard F. Connors Prize for Poetry: Sherod Santos, "Elegy for My Sister", and (separately) Neil Azevedo, "Caspar Hauser Songs"
Bobbitt National Prize for Poetry: Frank Bidart, Desire
Compton Crook Award: Katie Waitman, The Merro Tree
Hugo Award for Best Novel: Joe Haldeman, Forever Peace
Frost Medal: Stanley Kunitz
Nebula Award: Joe Haldeman, Forever Peace
Newbery Medal for children's literature: Karen Hesse, Out of the Dust
PEN American Center's PEN Open Book Award: Giannina Braschi, Yo-Yo Boing!
Pulitzer Prize for Drama: Paula Vogel, How I Learned to Drive
Pulitzer Prize for Fiction: Philip Roth, American Pastoral
Pulitzer Prize for Poetry: Charles Wright, Black Zodiac
Wallace Stevens Award: A. R. Ammons
Whiting Awards:
Fiction: Michael Byers, Ralph Lombreglia (fiction/nonfiction)
Non-fiction: D. J. Waldie, Anthony Walton
Plays: W. David Hancock
Poetry: Nancy Eimers, Daniel Hall, James Kimbrell, Charles Harper Webb, Greg Williamson

Elsewhere
International Dublin Literary Award: Herta Muller, The Land of Green Plums
Premio Nadal: Lucía Etxebarria, Beatriz y los cuerpos celestes

References

 
Literature
Years of the 20th century in literature